You Keep the Kids! is a 2021 Spanish comedy film directed by Dani de la Orden starring Miren Ibarguren and Paco León. It is a remake of the 2015 French film Daddy or Mommy.

Plot 
The plot tracks Víctor and Flora, a marriage in the process of divorcing who, upon the enticing prospect of a career advance, deliberatedly try not to get the legal custody of their three children, Alexia, Juan and Sara.

Cast

Production 
The film is a remake of the 2015 French film Daddy or Mommy, directed by Martin Bourboulon and written by Guillaume Clicquot de Mentque, Matthieu Delaporte, Jérôme Fansten, Alexandre de La Patellière. The screenplay was adapted by Eric Navarro. The film was produced by Atresmedia Cine alongside Warner Bros. Entertainment España, Alamo Producciones Audiovisuales and Alamo Audiovisual Séptima Parte, AIE, and it had the participation of Atresmedia, Movistar+ and Orange. Shot in between Madrid and Tenerife, filming wrapped by August 2020.

Release 
Originally slated for an opening in Spanish theatres on 4 December 2020, its release was postponed several times. Distributed by Warner Bros. Pictures España, the film was postponed due to the COVID-19 pandemic and eventually released theatrically in Spain on 17 December 2021.

See also 
 List of Spanish films of 2021

References

External links 
 You Keep the Kids at ICAA's Catálogo de Cinespañol

Spanish remakes of French films
2021 comedy films
Films shot in Madrid
Films shot in the Canary Islands
2020s Spanish-language films
Spanish comedy films
Atresmedia Cine films
2020s Spanish films